Rietheim railway station is a railway station in the Swiss canton of Aargau and municipality of Rietheim. The station is located on the Winterthur to Koblenz line of Swiss Federal Railways.

Services
 the following services stop at Rietheim:

References

External links
 
 

Rietheim
Rietheim